Washington Gas Building is a high-rise building located in the United States capital of Washington, D.C. It rises to  with approximately 15 floors. The building's construction was completed in 1941. The architects of the building were Jarrett C. White and Leon Chatelain Jr.

See also
List of tallest buildings in Washington, D.C.

References

Office buildings completed in 1941
Gas
1941 establishments in Washington, D.C.